Antonio de Cardona y de Xerica-Aragon (1395 – 1458 in Naples, Italy) Viceroy of Sicily 1419–1421, son of Hugo de Cardona and Beatriz de Xerica y Martinez de Luna,

In 1400, Antonio de Cardona y de Xerica-Aragon married "Leonor Manoel de Vilhena" (born 1380)

They had:
1) Pedro de Cardona (died 1451), 1st Count of Collisano, Knight of the Order of the Golden Fleece.

Further reading
http://www.grandesp.org.uk/historia/gzas/cardonadq.htm
 

1395 births
1458 deaths
15th-century Italian nobility
15th-century Sicilian people
15th-century viceregal rulers
Viceroys of Sicily
Counts of Malta